210 (two hundred [and] ten) is the natural number following 209 and preceding 211.

In mathematics 

210 is a composite number, an abundant number, Harshad number, and the product of the first four prime numbers (2, 3, 5, and 7), and thus a primorial. It is also the least common multiple of these four prime numbers. It is the sum of eight consecutive prime numbers (13 + 17 + 19 + 23 + 29 + 31 + 37 + 41 = 210).

It is a triangular number (following 190 and preceding 231), a pentagonal number (following 176 and preceding 247), and the second smallest to be both triangular and pentagonal (the third is 40755).

It is also an idoneal number, a pentatope number, a pronic number, and an untouchable number. 210 is also the third 71-gonal number, preceding 418. It is the first primorial number greater than 2 which is not adjacent to 2 primes (211 is prime, but 209 is not).

It is the largest number n such that all primes between n/2 and n yield a representation as a sum of two primes.

See also 
210 BC
AD 210
North American telephone area code area code 210

References

Integers